Crepis intermedia is a North American species of flowering plant in the family Asteraceae known by the common name limestone hawksbeard. It is native to the Pacific Northwest, Columbia Plateau, Great Plains and Southwestern regions of western North America.

Crepis intermedia grows in many types of open and forested habitat. It is a perennial herb growing an erect, multibranched stem from a thick taproot, reaching up to 70 centimeters (28 inches) in height. It has woolly green herbage. The leaves are lined with triangular lobes and the lowest leaves approach 40 centimeters (16 inches) long. The inflorescence is an open array of many ligulate flower heads, each with woolly phyllaries and several yellow ray florets but no disc florets. The fruit is a narrow, ribbed achene just under a centimeter long.

References

External links
 Calflora Database:  Crepis intermedia (Intermediate hawksbeard,  Limestone hawksbeard)
Jepson Manual eFlora (TJM2) treatment of Crepis intermedia
USDA Plants Profile for Crepis intermedia (limestone hawksbeard)
UC Calphotos gallery of Crepis intermedia

intermedia
Flora of Western Canada
Flora of the Western United States
Flora of California
Flora of the Sierra Nevada (United States)
Plants described in 1884
Taxa named by Asa Gray
Flora without expected TNC conservation status